A partial solar eclipse will occur on May 20, 2069. A solar eclipse occurs when the Moon passes between Earth and the Sun, thereby totally or partly obscuring the image of the Sun for a viewer on Earth. A partial solar eclipse occurs in the polar regions of the Earth when the center of the Moon's shadow misses the Earth.

This event will mark the beginning of Solar Saros 158.

This is the third eclipse this season.

First eclipse this season: April 21, 2069 – Partial Solar Eclipse

Second eclipse this season: May 5–6, 2069 – Total Lunar Eclipse

Related eclipses

Solar eclipses 2065–2069

Metonic series

References

External links 

2069 5 20
2069 5 20
2069 in science